The Inkigayo Chart is a music program record chart on Seoul Broadcasting System (SBS) that gives an award to the best-performing single of the week in South Korea. The chart measures digital performance in domestic online music services (55%), social media via YouTube views (30%), album sales (10%), network on-air time (10%), and advanced viewer votes (5%) in its ranking methodology.

In 2020, 26 singles have ranked number one on the chart and 21 music acts received an award trophy for this feat. Eleven songs have collected trophies for three weeks and earned a Triple Crown: Red Velvet's "Psycho", Zico's "Any Song", BTS's "On", "Dynamite", and "Life Goes On", Itzy's "Wannabe", IU's "Eight", Blackpink's "How You Like That", "Ice Cream" and "Lovesick Girls", and Hwasa's "María".

Chart history

References 

2020 in South Korean music
2020 record charts
Lists of number-one songs in South Korea